This is a list of Belgian football transfers for the 2015-16 winter transfer window. Only transfers involving a team from the Belgian Pro League are listed.

The winter transfer window opens on 1 January 2016, although a few transfers may take place prior to that date. The window closes at midnight on 1 February 2016 although outgoing transfers might still happen to leagues in which the window is still open. Players without a club may join teams, either during or in between transfer windows.

Sorted by date

November 2015

December 2015

January 2016

February 2016

Sorted by team

Anderlecht

In:

Out:

Charleroi

In:

Out:

Club Brugge

In:

Out:

Genk

In:

Out:

Gent

In:

Out:

Kortrijk

In:

Out:

Lokeren

In:

Out:

Mechelen

In:

 

 

Out:

Mouscron-Péruwelz

In:

Out:

Oostende

In:

Out:

Oud-Heverlee Leuven

In:

Out:

Sint-Truiden

In:

 

 

Out:

Standard Liège

In:

 
 
 
 
 
 
 
 
 

Out:

Waasland-Beveren

In:

 
 

Out:

Westerlo

In:

Out:

Zulte Waregem

In:

Out:

Footnotes

References

Belgian
Transfers Winter
2015 Winter